James Gustave (Gus) Speth (born March 4, 1942) is an American environmental lawyer and advocate who co-founded the Natural Resources Defense Council.

Early life and education 
He was born in Orangeburg, South Carolina in 1942. He graduated summa cum laude from Yale University in 1964, attended Balliol College, Oxford as a Rhodes Scholar and graduated from Yale Law School, where he was a member of St. Anthony Hall and the Yale Law Journal, in 1969.

Career 
In 1969 and 1970, Speth served as a law clerk to U.S. Supreme Court Justice Hugo L. Black. He was a co-founder of the Natural Resources Defense Council, where he served as senior attorney from 1970 to 1977.

He served from 1977 to 1981 as a member and then for two years as chairman of the Council on Environmental Quality in the Executive Office of the President. As chair, he was a principal adviser on matters affecting the environment and had overall responsibility for developing and coordinating the President's environmental program. In 1981 and 1982, he was professor of law at Georgetown University Law Center, teaching environmental and constitutional law.

In 1982, he founded the World Resources Institute, a Washington, D.C.-based environmental think tank, and served as its president until January 1993. He was a senior adviser to President-elect Bill Clinton's transition team, heading the group that examined the U.S.'s role in natural resources, energy and the environment.

In 1991, he chaired a U.S. task force on international development and environmental security which produced the report Partnership for Sustainable Development: A New U.S. Agenda.

In 1990 he led the Western Hemisphere Dialogue on Environment and Development which produced the report Compact for a New World.

From 1993 to 1999, he served as Administrator of the United Nations Development Programme; he served as special coordinator for economic and social affairs under Secretary-General Boutros Boutros-Ghali, managed the United Nations Development Assistance Plan and also served as chair of the United Nations Sustainable Development Group.

In 1999, he became the dean of the Yale School of Forestry and Environmental Studies at Yale University, New Haven, Connecticut. He served the school as the Carl W. Knobloch, Jr. Dean and Sara Shallenberger Brown Professor in the Practice of Environmental Policy when he retired from Yale in 2009 to assume a professorship at Vermont Law School in South Royalton, Vermont. Speth was succeeded as Dean at Yale by Sir Peter Crane.

In 2014 he published his memoir Angels by the River. In that year, he was also board member of the New Economy Coalition.

Speth currently serves on the advisory council of Represent.Us, a nonpartisan anti-corruption organization.

Speth has been a leader or participant in many task forces and committees aimed at combating environmental degradation, including the President's Task Force on Global Resources and Environment; the Western Hemisphere Dialogue on Environment and Development; and the National Commission on the Environment.

Awards
Among his awards are the National Wildlife Federation’s Resources Defense Award, the Natural Resources Council of America's Barbara Swain Award of Honor, a 1997 Special Recognition Award from the Society for International Development, the Lifetime Achievement Award of the Environmental Law Institute, and the Blue Planet Prize. He holds honorary degrees from Clark University, the College of the Atlantic, Vermont Law School, Middlebury College, and the University of Massachusetts Boston.

Publications

Books
 Globalization and the Environment (as an editor), Island Press (2003) 
 Red Sky at Morning: America and the Crisis of the Global Environment (2004)
 Global Environmental Governance, Island Press (2006)
 The Bridge at the Edge of the World: Capitalism, the Environment, and Crossing from Crisis to Sustainability, Yale University Press (2008) 
 America the Possible: Manifesto for a New Economy, Yale University Press (2012) 
 Moral Ground: Ethical Action for a Planet in Peril (chapter), Nelson, Michael P. and Kathleen Dean Moore (eds.) Trinity University Press, (2010) 
 Angels by the River, a memoir, Chelsea Green Publishing (2014)
 Imagine a Joyful Economy, with Peter Denton, Wood Lake Publishing Inc. (2020) 
 They Knew: The US Federal Government's Fifty-Year Role in Causing the Climate Crisis, MIT Press (2021)

Articles
 Beyond Reform Our Planet Magazine PDF
 America the Possible: A Manifesto, From decline to rebirth  link
 America the Possible: A Manifesto, A new politics for a new dream link

See also 
List of law clerks of the Supreme Court of the United States (Seat 1)

References

External links 

 Angels by the River - book website
 
 
  Yale School of Forestry and Environmental Studies profile, Archived July 1, 2007
 Greenery and Justice for All - Jan 9, 2015, Pacific Standard interview
“Focus 580; Red Sky at Morning: America and the Crisis of Global Environment,” 2004-06-29, WILL Illinois Public Media, American Archive of Public Broadcasting (GBH and the Library of Congress), Boston, MA and Washington, DC, accessed June 5, 2021.

|-

1942 births
Living people
People from Orangeburg, South Carolina
American non-fiction environmental writers
Yale University faculty
Yale Law School alumni
Alumni of Balliol College, Oxford
American Rhodes Scholars
Sustainability advocates
Administrators of the United Nations Development Programme
Natural Resources Defense Council people
Carter administration personnel
American environmental lawyers
Law clerks of the Supreme Court of the United States
American officials of the United Nations
Carnegie Council for Ethics in International Affairs
20th-century American lawyers
21st-century American lawyers